Taft Avenue is a major road in the south of Metro Manila. It passes through three cities in the metropolis: Manila, Pasay and Parañaque. The road was named after the former Governor-General of the Philippines and U.S. President, William Howard Taft; the Philippines was a former commonwealth territory of the United States in the first half of the 20th century. The avenue is a component of National Route 170 (N170), a secondary road in the Philippine highway network, and anchors R-2 of the Manila arterial road network.

Route description

From the north, Taft Avenue starts at the Lagusnilad vehicular underpass at intersection with Padre Burgos Avenue in Ermita. It then crosses the Ayala Boulevard and Finance Street and forms the eastern edge of Rizal Park up to Kalaw Avenue. It then crosses United Nations Avenue, Padre Faura Street, Pedro Gil Street (formerly known as Herran Street), where it also crosses the district boundary with Malate, crossing San Andres Street, Quirino Avenue, and Pablo Ocampo Street (formerly known as Vito Cruz Street) before entering the city of Pasay. In Pasay, it crosses Gil Puyat Avenue (formerly known as Buendia Avenue), Arnaiz Avenue (formerly known as Libertad Street), and Epifanio delos Santos Avenue (EDSA), where the intersection is known as Pasay Rotonda. The avenue then continues south towards Baclaran in Parañaque as Taft Avenue Extension up to its terminus at its intersection with Elpidio Quirino Avenue, Harrison Avenue, and Redemptorist Road.

History

Construction of this avenue, originally called Calle Rizal, was completed in 1899, with Calle Padre Burgos as its northern terminus and Calle Herran (now Pedro Gil Street) as its southern terminus. Engineers Manny Aquino and Robin Santos led its extension in 1911, and the avenue was renamed Manila Road. However, a map of Manila produced in 1915 by the Office of Department Engineer, Philippine Department, indicates it was named Taft Avenue. At the height of World War II during the Japanese occupation of the Philippines, it was renamed to Daitoa Avenue in 1942. The avenue's portion from Padre Burgos to Herran was also one of the right-of-way alignments of tranvía that existed until 1945.

Having previously ended at Calle San Andres in Malate, it was later extended towards Calle Vito Cruz (present-day Pablo Ocampo Street) in 1940. It was later extended towards Pasay, then a part of the province of Rizal, and was named Ermita-Pasay Boulevard or Highway 50, with the route continuing past Highway 54 (P. Lovina Street, now EDSA) as Cavite-Manila South Road or Manila South Road (later renamed to Mexico Road in 1964). Afterwards, the avenue's section from EDSA to Baclaran became Taft Avenue Extension. 

The LRT Line 1, the first elevated rail track in the Philippines, was built over it and opened in 1984.

Proposed renaming to Senator Jose W. Diokno Avenue
In 1998, a bill was authored in the Philippine House of Representatives to rename Taft Avenue to Senator Jose W. Diokno Avenue, after the former senator and nationalist. It was sponsored by Reps. Jose Apolinario Lozada (Negros Occidental–5th) and Migz Zubiri (Bukidnon–3rd). Senator Franklin Drilon later filed its Senate counterpart, Senate Bill No. 2011, in 2002. It was passed on the second reading in January 2004. Manila local officials led by Mayor Lito Atienza opposed the passage, citing that William Howard Taft was a "key figure in the history" of the Philippines and of Manila and is against a policy set by the city government in 1998 to disallow renaming of streets.

Later on June 30, 2004, Senator Sergio Osmeña III authored Senate Bill No. 497, another Senate bill seeking to rename Taft Avenue to Senator Jose W. Diokno Avenue. However, the bill is still pending in the Committee as of August 2004.

Attractions

Rizal Park
One of the three entrances to Rizal Park (the others being Maria Orosa Street and Roxas Boulevard), the Taft Avenue entrance is also adjacent to the National Museum of Fine Arts (formerly Old Legislative Building) and the National Museum of Anthropology (formerly the Finance Building), as well as the Statue of the Sentinel of Freedom.

Government buildings
Taft Avenue is home (or adjacent) to some government buildings: the Supreme Court of the Philippines, Court of Appeals, Bureau of Plant Industry, Philippine General Hospital, National Bureau of Investigation and Times Plaza.

World Health Organization
The office of the World Health Organization Western Pacific Region is located on Taft Avenue corner United Nations Avenue, adjacent to the LRT Line 1 United Nations station.

University Belt
Taft Avenue forms a part of the University Belt. Universities such as the De La Salle University, De La Salle–College of Saint Benilde, University of the Philippines Manila, Philippine Christian University, Philippine Women's University and the Philippine Normal University are located on Taft Avenue. The Santa Isabel College Manila, Emilio Aguinaldo College, Araullo High School and the Manila Science High School also face the road directly, while Adamson University has direct walkway access from the road.

National Cathedral of the Philippine Independent Church

The National Cathedral of the Holy Child (Holy Infant Jesus) of the Philippine Independent Church is located on Taft Avenue.

Intersections

Transportation

Taft Avenue is accessed through jeepneys, taxis, buses, UV Express, the LRT Line 1, and the MRT Line 3. The avenue houses some LRT Line 1 stations namely: Baclaran station (for Taft Avenue Extension), EDSA (interchange to MRT Line 3 at Taft Avenue station), Libertad, Gil Puyat, Vito Cruz, Quirino, Pedro Gil, United Nations, and Central Terminal (via Lawton Bus Terminal).

References

 National Museum of the Philippines

Streets in Manila
Ermita
Malate, Manila